Propyliodone (INN, trade name Dionosil) is a molecule used as a contrast medium in bronchography. It was developed by a team at Imperial Chemical Industries in the late 1930s.

References

Iodoarenes
Carboxylate esters
4-Pyridones
Radiocontrast agents
Propyl esters